East Tanfield is a civil parish in the Hambleton District of North Yorkshire, England.  There is no modern village in the parish, and the population was estimated at 30 in 2013.  The deserted medieval village of East Tanfield lies near Manor Farm on the banks of the River Ure.

East Tanfield was mentioned in the Domesday Book, when it was in the possession of Count Alan of Brittany. It was a prosperous community in the medieval period, but appears to have been deserted in the 16th century.

East Tanfield was historically a township in the ancient parish of Kirklington in the North Riding of Yorkshire.  It became a separate civil parish in 1866.  It was transferred to North Yorkshire in 1974.  The parish shares a grouped parish council, Tanfield Parish Council, with the much larger parish of West Tanfield.

References

Civil parishes in North Yorkshire
Deserted medieval villages in North Yorkshire